Indianwood Golf and Country Club or simply "Indianwood" is a private member-only country club located in Orion Township, Oakland County, near Lake Orion, Michigan.

History
The "Old Course" was designed by Wilfrid Reid in 1925, the original club features a tower entrance, 18th century tapestries, leaded glass windows, and Knights in shining armor.  The ballroom features a magnificent fireplace complete with an intricate shield carved from wood hanging over the mantel.  According to historians, the club quickly became a haven for the wealthy of Detroit seeking to avoid the daily grind of the city.  The club became very popular, hosting the Michigan Open in 1928, and even saw the construction of an airstrip.  In 1930 the club hosted the Western Open, one of the most prestigious golf events of the time.  In 1948 and 1949 it was site of the Michigan PGA Championship, won by Horton Smith and Chick Harbert, respectively.

The 1960s and 1970s saw Indianwood fall into decline. The bustling club fell into disrepair, with holes in the floors and beams hanging from the ceiling.  In 1981, Detroit-area businessman Stan Aldridge purchased the building and surrounding land after being outbid for the Detroit Red Wings by Mike Ilitch.  Aldridge, a non-golfer, saw the club as an investment and sought to restore the club to its former glory.  Two of Aldridge's uncles were members of the club in the 1950s, and he we could accompany them to Sunday brunches.  The original buildings and barns were restored, and the  clubhouse and locker room addition was completed in 1989.  Eventually a "New Course" for golf would be added to the original in 1988.

In 1989, the re-established club hosted its largest event, the 1989 U.S. Women's Open won by Betsy King. It would host the event again 5 years later in 1994, which was won by Patty Sheehan. It hosted the U.S. Senior Open in 2012, won by Roger Chapman.

Management
Stan Aldridge and his children are still connected to the club through day-to-day operations, new construction, and design.  Son Keith Aldridge, a former professional hockey player, serves as the club's Vice President and General Manager.

For his work with Indianwood and other courses in the state, Stan Aldridge was elected to the Michigan Golf Hall of Fame in 2005.

Major tournaments
 1930 Western Open, winner Gene Sarazen
 1989 U.S. Women's Open, winner Betsy King
 1994 U.S. Women's Open, winner Patty Sheehan
 2012 U.S. Senior Open, winner Roger Chapman

References

External links
Indianwood Golf and Country Club
Indianwood Golf and Country Club >> Michigan Golfer

Golf clubs and courses in Michigan
Sports venues in Oakland County, Michigan
Event venues established in 1925
1925 establishments in Michigan